Sofie Wolfs (born 15 April 1981 in Kapellen, Antwerp) is a retired female backstroke swimmer from Belgium, who competed for her native country at the 2000 Olympic Games in Sydney, Australia.

Wolfs is best known for winning the silver medal in the women's 4×100 m medley relay event at the 2000 European LC Championships in Helsinki, Finland, alongside Brigitte Becue (breaststroke), Fabienne Dufour (butterfly), and Nina van Koeckhoven (freestyle).

References
 sports-reference

1981 births
Living people
Belgian female backstroke swimmers
Swimmers at the 2000 Summer Olympics
Olympic swimmers of Belgium
European Aquatics Championships medalists in swimming
People from Kapellen, Belgium
Sportspeople from Antwerp Province